"Bubblin'" is a song by English boy band Blue. The song was released as the fourth and final single from their third studio album, Guilty (2003). Uncredited on the song is girl group L.A.D.É., who performs the rap verse. It was released as a single on 28 June 2004 in the United Kingdom, where it reached nine on the UK Singles Chart. It also became a top-ten hit in Switzerland and Wallonia, as well as a top-five hit in Hungary and Italy. A French version of the song featuring Linkup, titled "You and Me Bubblin'", was released in France and peaked at number 13.

Track listings
UK CD1 and European CD single
 "Bubblin'" (single version featuring L.A.D.É.) – 3:42
 "Bubblin'" (Urban North Master mix featuring L.A.D.É.) – 5:39

UK CD2
 "Bubblin'" (single version featuring L.A.D.É.) – 3:42
 "Move On" – 3:33
 "Bubblin'" (Love 4 Music remix featuring L.A.D.É. and Blarny) – 4:09
 "Bubblin'" (Obi & Josh remix) – 3:30

European maxi-CD single
 "Bubblin'" (single version featuring L.A.D.É.) – 3:42
 "Move On" – 3:33
 "Bubblin'" (Urban North remix featuring L.A.D.É.) – 4:09
 "Bubblin'" (Obi & Josh remix) – 3:30

Japanese CD single
 "Bubblin'" (single version featuring L.A.D.É.) – 3:44
 "Move On" – 3:34
 "Bubblin'" (Urban North remix featuring L.A.D.É.) – 5:41
 "Bubblin'" (Obi & Josh remix) – 3:31
 "Bubblin'" (Love 4 Music remix featuring L.A.D.É. and Blarny) – 4:13

"You and Me Bubblin"
 "You and Me Bubblin'" (with Linkup) – 3:08
 "Bubblin'" (radio version) – 3:05
 "Bubblin'" (Obi & Josh remix) – 3:30

Credits and personnel
Credits for "Bubblin'" are lifted from the UK CD1 liner notes. Additional personnel for "You and Me Bubblin'" are lifted from the French CD single liner notes.

Studios
 Recorded and mixed at Deekay Studio (Copenhagen, Denmark)
 Additional vocals recorded at Metropolis Studios (London, England) and Sanctuary Studios (Watford, England)

Personnel

 Antony Costa – writing
 Lars Halvor Jensen – writing, all instruments, vocal production
 Johannes Joergensen – writing
 Ali Tennant – writing
 Lareece – writing (rap), rap
 François Welgryn – writing ("You and Me Bubblin'")
 Martin M. Larsson – all instruments
 Josh – all instruments and programming
 Deekay – production, mixing

Charts

Weekly charts

Year-end charts

References

2003 songs
2004 singles
Blue (English band) songs
EMI Music France singles
Innocent Records singles
Songs written by Ali Tennant
Songs written by Antony Costa
Songs written by Johannes Jørgensen
Songs written by Lars Halvor Jensen
Virgin Records singles